The 1997–98 season was the 103rd season in the history of Plymouth Argyle Football Club, their 73rd in the Football League,

Players

First-team squad
Squad at end of season

Left club during season

Second Division

Final standings

Results by round

Matches

FA Cup

Football League Cup

Football League Trophy

Notes

References

Plymouth Argyle F.C. seasons
Plymouth Argyle